Riluzole is a medication used to treat amyotrophic lateral sclerosis and other motor neuron diseases. Riluzole delays the onset of ventilator-dependence or tracheostomy in some people and may increase survival by two to three months. Riluzole is available in tablet and liquid form.

Medical use

Amyotrophic lateral sclerosis 
Riluzole was approved in the United States for the treatment of ALS by the U.S. Food and Drug Administration (FDA) in 1995. A Cochrane Library review states a 9% gain in the probability of surviving one year.

Adverse effects
 Very common (>10% frequency): nausea; weakness; decreased lung function
 Common (1–10% frequency): headache; dizziness; drowsiness; vomiting; abdominal pain; increased aminotransferases
 Uncommon (0.1-1% frequency): pancreatitis; interstitial lung disease
 Rare (<0.1% frequency): neutropenia; allergic reaction (including angiooedema, anaphylactoid reaction)

Overdose
Symptoms of overdose include: neurological and psychiatric symptoms, acute toxic encephalopathy with stupor, coma and methemoglobinemia. Severe methemoglobinemia may be rapidly reversible after treatment with methylene blue.

Contraindications
Contraindications for riluzole include: known prior hypersensitivity to riluzole or any of the excipients inside the preparations, liver disease, pregnancy or lactation.

Interactions
CYP1A2 substrates, inhibitors and inducers would probably interact with riluzole, due its dependency on this cytochrome for metabolism.

Mechanism of action
Riluzole preferentially blocks TTX-sensitive sodium channels, which are associated with damaged neurons. Riluzole has also been reported to directly inhibit the kainate and NMDA receptors. The drug has also been shown to postsynaptically potentiate GABAA receptors via an allosteric binding site. However, the action of riluzole on glutamate receptors has been controversial, as no binding of the drug to any known sites has been shown for them. In addition, as its antiglutamatergic action is still detectable in the presence of sodium channel blockers, it is also uncertain whether or not it acts via this way. Rather, its ability to stimulate glutamate uptake seems to mediate many of its effects. In addition to its role in accelerating glutamate clearance from the synapse, riluzole may also prevent glutamate release from presynaptic terminals. Since CK1δ plays a key role in TDP-43 proteinopathy, a pathological hallmark of ALS, this could help to better decipher drug mechanism of action.

Synthesis

Riluzole can be prepared beginning with the reaction of 4-(trifluoromethoxy)aniline with potassium thiocyanate followed by reaction with bromine, forming the thiazole ring.

Society and culture

Legal status 
Riluzole was approved for medical use in the European Union in October 1996.

Research
A number of case studies have indicated that riluzole may have use in mood and anxiety disorders.

A reformulation of riluzole that originated at Yale University and is known by the code name BHV-0223 is under development for the treatment of generalized anxiety disorder and mood disorders by Biohaven Pharmaceuticals.

Riluzole, which is neuroprotective and a glutamate modulator could be used for psychiatric problems though it failed in trials of Huntington's disease and Parkinson's disease.

See also
 List of investigational antidepressants
 List of investigational anxiolytics
 4-Aminopyridine

References

External links
 National Institute for Health and Clinical Excellence (NICE) guidelines for prescription of riluzole in the UK
 

Benzothiazoles
Drugs with unknown mechanisms of action
GABA reuptake inhibitors
Glycine receptor antagonists
Trifluoromethyl ethers